John Forester or Forrester may refer to:

Politicians
John Foster (by 1508 – between 1547 and 1551), a.k.a. John Forester
John Howard Forester (1887–1958), Canadian politician
John B. Forester (died 1845), American politician from Tennessee
John Forrester (politician) (1924–2007), British politician

Others
John Forester (cyclist) (1929–2020), American cycling activist
John F. Forester, American planning theorist
John Forrester (historian) (1949–2015), British historian and philosopher
John Forrester (trade unionist) (died 1978), British trade union official
John Forrester (umpire) (1887–1946), New Zealand cricket umpire

See also
Jack Forrester of Nebraska State League
John Foster (disambiguation)